Mont-Tremblant/Saint-Jovite Airport  is located  north of Saint-Jovite, Quebec, Canada.

See also
 Mont-Tremblant/Lac Duhamel Water Aerodrome
 Mont-Tremblant/Lac Ouimet Water Aerodrome

References

External links
Page about this airport on COPA's Places to Fly airport directory

Registered aerodromes in Laurentides